SiriusXM Progress is located at channel 127 on Sirius XM Radio and carries a progressive talk radio format. The channel is programmed by Don Wicklin.

America Left (2004–2005)
Channel 167 originally started out as America Left, a channel dedicated to progressive talk radio to complement the reformatted XM 166, America Right. It launched on March 31, 2004, and the lineup included hosts like Ed Schultz, Randi Rhodes, Al Franken, Marty Kaplan, Janeane Garofalo, Alan Colmes, Lizz Winstead and Chuck D. At the time, both Sirius and XM had centrist/progressive  talk channels featuring talent from Air America Radio. The lineup was constant for over a year. One complaint often voiced was that two afternoon drive hosts, Ed Schultz and Randi Rhodes, each had an hour of their shows cut off to keep both shows on and live.

On April 11, 2005, XM and Air America announced that XM would become the exclusive satellite radio provider of the network, excluding Air America Syndication, beginning in May 2005. This forced Sirius to rid itself of all Air America Radio network programming. XM167's lineup didn't make any immediate lineup changes, but it did rebrand itself using the Air America name. Non-AAR hosts Ed Schultz and Alan Colmes remained on the channel.

Air America Radio (2005–2008) 
America Left took on its new name, Air America Radio, to boast the fact that XM was the exclusive provider. No lineup changes were made until September 2005, when Ed Schultz was moved over to Clear Channel's advice talker, Ask! on 165. This allowed Randi Rhodes to broadcast her entire show every afternoon. At the end of the year, Alan Colmes also made the move to the new Fox News Talk, a channel owned and operated by Fox News Radio. For the first time, Air America Radio on XM was now 100% Air America content on weekdays. A Best of Stephanie Miller segment was carried on Sunday mornings.

There were lineup changes occurring across the Air America Network that were reflected onto XM 167, such as Mike Malloy and Janeane Garofalo's departures, the end of Morning Sedition, and the hiring of The Young Turks. Some questioned the financial state of the network and whether or not XM was wise in paying for the exclusive rights to satellite broadcasting. More information on Air America's company state can be found in its article, including the company's bankruptcy and sale.

Old faces return
In 2007, XM announced that Ed Schultz, who was airing on Extreme XM on delay and truncated to two separate hours, was going to be returning to XM 167 to fill the timeslot being vacated by Al Franken. This allowed Schultz to return to the full three hours in a live timeslot. Some were not happy about this move as it prevented Thom Hartmann from taking the slot on the channel, prompting midday host Sam Seder to ask his listeners to call XM to complain. Schultz responded on air the next day claiming that "Air America sucks, their programs suck, they give liberals a bad name," and recommended that XM play other Jones radio hosts Stephanie Miller and Bill Press on channel 167. Schultz kept the timeslot, and Hartmann's show was eventually added to the channel's schedule. Bill Press and Stephanie Miller would be added later in 2008.

In addition to Schultz, XM exclusive shows The Agenda and Left Jab were added to XM 167 weekends. These moves have led listeners to question XM's confidence in the Air America Radio network, as ex-AAR host and current Nova M Radio host Mike Malloy returned to the channel in July, weeknights at 9 PM eastern.  With this rescheduling, XM moved Thom Hartmann from midnight to 6:00 PM eastern and the Air Americans, which previously aired in that time to midnight.

Despite being on a channel with the "Air America Radio" label, Schultz stated on February 13, 2007 that Air America "sucks"  and he doesn't want people who listen to AAR listening to him because he is "better than they are." These comment were in response to remarks by AAR host Sam Seder, who asked his listeners to call XM and request Thom Hartmann instead of Schultz. Seder's reasoning for his action is that he believes AAR hosts should be on the 'Air America Radio' channel. Hartmann was added to the channel beginning March 5, 2007, on a tape-delay basis at Midnight ET, and has since moved to an earlier time slot on the channel.

In April 2007, XM Radio Canada added the channel to its lineup unannounced, making Air America programs available in Canada. The AAR network has also announced that Sam Seder will become a Sunday host only, and has scheduled WOR talker Lionel to replace him. Eco-Talk has also been dropped by the network in favor for a four-hour Mark Riley program, and Jon Elliot doing midnights. XM has indicated that they will schedule Lionel and Seder's new timeslots.

In July 2007, Air America Radio let go of its top-of-the-hour news staff. Their reason was most AAR affiliates don't use AAR News at the top of the hour, opting for local news or another national service like CNN Radio. XM 167 was one of the few that used AAR News, and upon their removal, switched to AP Radio News.

AAR loses more time as cuts are made
Towards the end of 2007, the Young Turks were cut from the Air America lineup, claiming it was a mutual understanding. The trio plans a return through internet radio. In the meantime, XM Radio added its second Jones Radio personality, Bill Press, to the morning drive timeslot.

Although The Rachel Maddow Show expanded from two to three hours on March 10, 2008, XM 167 does not broadcast the third hour, instead playing a taped Thom Hartmann program. This became moot on September 8, 2008, when The Rachel Maddow Show returned to a two-hour format.

In April 2008, Randi Rhodes performed at an event in San Francisco sponsored by local affiliate KKGN, which included crude remarks made at Hillary Clinton as part of a comedy routine. This resulted in Air America suspending Rhodes from the network. She claimed that the network was in breach of her contract, and ended up resigning from Air America. Within 24 hours, it was announced that Nova M Radio was picking up her show nationally, and hopes to retain as many affiliates as possible. XM 167 continued to run AAR programming in afternoons until a deal with Nova M Radio was made.  On 2008-05-05, XM resumed broadcasting Randi Rhodes' show on Air America Radio channel 167. With this addition, the channel known as "Air America Radio" now only carried 13 hours of AAR programming per day, with 2 hours being distribution only, and only 7 of those hours in the daypart timeslots.

America Left (2008–2011) 
On June 18, 2008, XM announced that Air America Radio would be changing its name back to America Left, beginning July 14. The channel kept most of its lineup, however, Lionel was replaced by Jones Radio's Stephanie Miller. In addition, The Young Turks returned to the channel.

After the SiriusXM merger, the co-owned SIRIUS Left did not join the channel merger on November 12, 2008. Since February 2009, however, several SIRIUS Left shows have joined the America Left lineup, and all remaining Air America Media shows have been dropped. Nevertheless, the majority of America Left programming still consists of shows of former Air Americans: Mike Malloy, Thom Hartmann (twice a day), Bill Press, and the Young Turks.
(Randi Rhodes' official site http://www.RandiRhodes.com has said America Left has carried her show live since just after her return to the air with Premiere Radio Networks.)

On January 21, 2010, Air America Media announced that it would file for liquidation under Chapter 7 of the Bankruptcy Code, and ceased all live broadcasting that same evening.

Sirius XM Progress (2011–) 
On May 4, 2011, America Left (XM 167) and Sirius Left (Sirius 146) merged to become SiriusXM Left and aired on channel 127 on both services.  With the merger, a second channel SiriusXM Left Plus with timeshifting and additional airings of SiriusXM Left shows also started on online channel 853.

On July 22, 2013, SiriusXM Left was renamed SiriusXM Progress.  Along with the name change, several changes were made to the lineup.  The Agenda with Ari Rabin Havt replaced Bill Press at 6:00-9:00 AM EST, Michelangelo Signorile replaced Thom Hartmann at 3:00-6:00 PM EST and Make It Plain with Mark Thompson replaced Alex Bennett at 6:00-9:00 PM EST.  At the same time, SiriusXM Progress Plus, an online station also available through a smartphone app continued to air both Press and Hartmann at their regular times, as well as the usual lineup, though the showtimes differed slightly from those on the main Progress channel.

References

External links

Air America (radio network)
Sirius XM Radio channels
XM Satellite Radio channels
Radio stations established in 2004